Nour Zamen Zammouri  (born 1 December 1997 in Djerba) is a Tunisian football player who plays as a central defender for CS Sfaxien.

Club career
genesis in Espoir Sportif de Jerba Midoun, where he passed all categories.

On 21 December 2017, at the end of his contract with this club, he signed with CS Sfaxien.

On 14 September 2022, he was transferred to the Ismaily SC for a period of three years.

Honours and achievements

Club Sportif Sfaxien 
 Tunisian Cup (3).

References

External links

FDB Profile

 
1997 births
CS Sfaxien players
Living people
Tunisian footballers